Dipterocarpus costulatus is a species of tree in the family Dipterocarpaceae.

Distribution and habitat
Dipterocarpus costulatus is native to Peninsular Malaysia, Singapore, Borneo and Sumatra. Its habitat is in lowland kerangas forest or hill forest from sea level to  altitude.

Conservation
Dipterocarpus costulatus is threatened by logging and habitat loss, particularly in Borneo. The tree is logged for its hardwood. Forests where the species is present are being cleared for agricultural or plantation development. More frequent fires threaten lowland populations.

References

costulatus
Trees of Sumatra
Trees of Peninsular Malaysia
Trees of Borneo
Plants described in 1927
Flora of the Sundaland heath forests